Harmon Cobblestone Farmhouse and Cobblestone Smokehouse is a historic home located at Phelps in Ontario County, New York. The farmhouse was constructed in 1842 and is an example of vernacular Greek Revival style, cobblestone domestic architecture. The house consists of a 2-story, three-bay side-hall main block with a -story north wing and 1-story east wing.  The exterior walls are built primarily of small, red, oval, lake washed cobbles.  Also on the property is a smokehouse built of both red, lake washed cobbles and irregular field cobbles.  They are among the approximately 101 cobblestone buildings in Ontario County and 26 in the village and town of Phelps.

It was listed on the National Register of Historic Places in 1992.

References 

Houses on the National Register of Historic Places in New York (state)
Greek Revival houses in New York (state)
Cobblestone architecture
Houses completed in 1842
Houses in Ontario County, New York
National Register of Historic Places in Ontario County, New York